Africariola is a monotypic genus in the family Tettigoniidae found in southern Africa. The single species is A. longicauda, the Richtersveld katydid.

References

Meconematinae
Tettigoniidae genera
Monotypic Orthoptera genera